Hill City is a city and county seat of Graham County, Kansas, United States.  As of the 2020 census, the population of the city was 1,403.

History
The first settlement at Hill City was made in 1876, making it the oldest town in Graham County. The community was named after W. R. Hill, a first settler. Hill City was platted in 1878. The first post office in Hill City was established in September 1878. Hill City was designated county seat in 1880. By 1915, Hill City had 647 inhabitants.

Geography
Hill City is located at  (39.367319, -99.845558).

Climate
On June 9, 2005, a large tornado passed 1 mile south of Hill City. Another large tornado hit just north of the city on June 20, 2011.

On June 26, 2012, the temperature reached 115 °F (46 °C), breaking the June record tied just 2 days earlier and during the Dust Bowl on June 30, 1933; the town was the hottest city in the United States for four days in a row, with temperatures of 114°, 111°, 115°, and 115 °F (46°, 44°, 46°, and 46 °C).

Demographics

2010 census
As of the census of 2010, there were 1,474 people, 669 households, and 404 families residing in the city. The racial makeup of the city was 91.2% White, 4.5% African American, 0.8% Native American, 0.3% Asian, 0.3% from other races, and 2.8% from two or more races. Hispanic or Latino of any race were 2.5% of the population.

There were 669 households, of which 24.2% had children under the age of 18 living with them, 49.8% were married couples living together, 6.9% had a female householder with no husband present, 3.7% had a male householder with no wife present, and 39.6% were non-families. 35.4% of all households were made up of individuals, and 19.6% had someone living alone who was 65 years of age or older. The average household size was 2.14 and the average family size was 2.76.

The median age in the city was 48 years. 20.8% of residents were under the age of 18; 6.2% were between the ages of 18 and 24; 19% were from 25 to 44; 29.9% were from 45 to 64; and 23.9% were 65 years of age or older. The gender makeup of the city was 46.9% male and 53.1% female.

2000 census
As of the census of 2000, there were 1,604 people, 696 households, and 448 families residing in the city. The racial makeup of the city was 94.33% White, 3.43% African American, 0.19% Native American, 0.44% Asian, 0.06% Pacific Islander, 0.69% from other races, and 0.87% from two or more races. Hispanic or Latino of any race were 1.12% of the population.

There were 696 households, out of which 26.9% had children under the age of 18 living with them, 54.9% were married couples living together, 7.9% had a female householder with no husband present, and 35.5% were non-families. 32.6% of all households were made up of individuals, and 18.0% had someone living alone who was 65 years of age or older. The average household size was 2.21 and the average family size was 2.80.

In the city, the population was spread out, with 21.3% under the age of 18, 6.0% from 18 to 24, 21.6% from 25 to 44, 25.9% from 45 to 64, and 25.2% who were 65 years of age or older. The median age was 46 years. For every 100 females, there were 86.1 males. For every 100 females age 18 and over, there were 82.6 males.

The median income for a household in the city was $30,236, and the median income for a family was $36,500. Males had a median income of $26,207 versus $18,295 for females. The per capita income for the city was $16,989. About 6.2% of families and 11.1% of the population were below the poverty line, including 13.5% of those under age 18 and 11.5% of those age 65 or over.

Education
The community is served by Graham County USD 281 public school district. The district elementary and junior/senior high school are located in Hill City. It was previously known as Hill City USD 281.

Notable people
 Charles V. Park (1885–1982), noted librarian for whom the Charles V. Park Library at Central Michigan University is named, was born in town.

See also
 Hillsboro, Kansas, original name was Hill City

References

Further reading

External links
 City of Hill City
 Hill City - Directory of Public Officials
 Hill City map, KDOT

Cities in Kansas
County seats in Kansas
Cities in Graham County, Kansas
1876 establishments in Kansas
Populated places established in 1876